Andrea Sestini Hlaváčková and Lucie Hradecká were the defending champions having won the previous edition in 2013, but Hradecká chose to compete at the 2021 Prague Open instead, whilst Sestini Hlaváčková retired from professional tennis in 2019.

Mihaela Buzărnescu and Fanny Stollár won the title, defeating Aliona Bolsova and Tamara Korpatsch in the final, 6–4, 6–4.

Seeds

Draw

Draw

References
Main Draw

Budapest Grand Prix - Doubles
2021 Doubles